Angel Stoyanov (Bulgarian: Ангел Стоянов; born 31 December 1986) is a Bulgarian retired footballer who played as a midfielder.

Career

Vitosha Bistritsa
Being a part of the team since 2011, Stoyanov made his fully professional debut for the team in their first season on the top level in the league match against Levski Sofia on 30 July 2017.

International career
Stoyanov was part of Southeast Bulgaria's amateur team.

References

External links
 

1986 births
Living people
Bulgarian footballers
Association football forwards
FC Vitosha Bistritsa players
First Professional Football League (Bulgaria) players